Encs is a small town in Borsod-Abaúj-Zemplén county, Northern Hungary, 30 kilometers from the county capital Miskolc.

History
The area has been inhabited for at least 6,000 years.  After the Hungarians occupied the area, it became part of Újvár comitatus (later Abaúj county). The first recorded mention of the village was in 1219.

The railway line reached the village in 1860. In 1880 Encs had about 1,000 residents. After the treaty of Trianon Encs was the most important village of the parts of Abaúj-Torna county that remained in Hungary. The next few decades brought prosperity. In 1962 it became the centre of the unified districts of Encs, Abaújszántó and Szikszó, and gained town status in 1984.

Twin towns – sister cities

Encs is twinned with:
 Bad Dürrenberg, Germany
 Ghelința, Romania
 Kępno, Poland
 Moldava nad Bodvou, Slovakia

References

External links

 in Hungarian

Populated places in Borsod-Abaúj-Zemplén County